Kim Jeong-gyun (born December 23, 1985), better known as kkOma, is a South Korean professional League of Legends coach. As the coach of SK Telecom T1, kkOma was a three-time world champion, two-time Mid-Season Invitational champion, and ten-time LCK champion. kkOma is widely considered the greatest coach in League of Legends history. He is known for his strict coaching attitude and aptitude for developing talented rookies. He was also a finalist for the 2017 and 2021 World Championship.

Prior to becoming a coach, kkOma enjoyed a short professional career in esports. He competed in StarCraft II competing under the ID "LittleBoy" for "Team Old Generations". After unsuccessful attempts to qualify for Global StarCraft II League, he quit Starcraft II and competed for one season of League of Legends Champions Korea for the team "Startale". He played as the jungler for Startale.

kkOma is the only coach who owns a ward skin in League of Legends, which is SKT T1 kkOma Ward.

He is the head coach of Korea's Asian Games 2022 League of Legends team.

Career

SK Telecom T1

Coach 
In 2012, SKT T1 named kkOma the head coach of their League of Legends team in preparation for the upcoming 2013 Season 3. kkOma recruited players Faker, Bengi, Piglet, Impact, and PoohManDu to form the original SKT T1 team. kkOma and his team had won the Champions Summer 2013 and the 2013 World Championship.

Following a relatively disappointing Season 4, SKT T1 bounced back in 2015 Season 5. In 2015, kkOma was among the first coach to successfully implement two players equally sharing the same role, by having Faker and Easyhoon share the mid lane position. This allowed SKT T1 to adopt diverse play styles depending on which player was swapped in. kkOma would lead his team to sweep the calendar year by winning LCK Spring 2015,  LCK Summer 2015, and the 2015 World Championship, becoming the first coach to win more than one World Championships.

Head coach 
kkOma successfully led his team to the seventh LCK title on 13 April 2019. This was his first win after being promoted as the head coach of SK Telecom T1 in November 2017.

On 27 November 2019, it was announced that kkOma would leave SKT T1.

Vici Gaming 
On 17 December 2019, Vici Gaming announced that kkOma joined the team as their head coach. He parted ways with Vici Gaming in September 2020 due to family reasons.

DWG KIA 
In November 2020, kkOma was being reported as the new head coach of DWG KIA (formerly Damwon Gaming) after the departure of their coaches, Yang “Daeny” Dae-in and Kim “Zefa” Jae-min.

During the 2021 season, kkOma and his team were runners up in the 2021 Mid-Season Invitational, and the 2021 League of Legends World Championship.

South Korea League of Legends team 
In March 2022, the Korea Esports Association (KeSPA) announced the appointment of kkOma as the head coach for the South Korean League of Legends team for the 2022 Asian Games.

References

Notes 

Living people
League of Legends coaches
StarTale players
1985 births
The Game Awards winners
South Korean esports players